The  took place at White City, London in Great Britain from 14 May 1910 to 29 October 1910. It was the largest international exposition that the Empire of Japan had ever participated in and was driven by a desire of Japan to develop a more favorable public image in Britain and Europe following the renewal of the Anglo-Japanese Alliance. It was also hoped that the display of manufactured products would lead to increased Japanese trade with Britain.  Japan made a successful effort to display its new status as a great power by emphasizing its new role as a colonial power in Asia.

Background

A proposal was made in 1908 for an Exhibition to be held in London to celebrate and reinforce the Anglo-Japanese Alliance on a grass-roots level. It was strongly supported by Japanese Foreign Minister Jutaro Komura, who was aware that there still was a general conception in the West of Japan as a backward and undeveloped country, despite the Boxer Rebellion and the Russo-Japanese War. The Japanese Diet voted an enormous sum to sponsor the Exhibition in 1909, despite the fact that the Treasury had been drained from the Russo-Japanese War, and the economy was on the verge of bankruptcy.

Baron Ōura Kanetake, who was then Minister of Agriculture and Commerce, was the President of the Japanese committee organizing the exhibition.  His British counterpart was Henry Fitzalan-Howard, 15th Duke of Norfolk.

The Japanese display covered , three times the space Japan occupied at the previous Paris Exhibition of 1900, not including an additional  for two large Japanese gardens. There were some 2,271 Japanese exhibitors.

The Imperial Japanese Navy sent the Japanese-built cruiser Ikoma (which was anchored at Gravesend in Kent) to underscore that the Anglo-Japanese Alliance was primarily a naval alliance and to stress that Japan was a formidable military power worthy of partnership with Great Britain.

A visit by Queen Alexandra in mid-March, in advance of the opening, added publicity and royal prestige to the Exhibition. The death of King Edward VII caused the opening to be delayed until 14 May. By the time the event closed on 29 October, over 8 million visitors had attended.

The Exhibition was widely known in London as 'the Japanese Exhibition' rather than 'the Japan–British Exhibition', as there was minimal British content.

Exhibits

The Japanese gardens had to be constructed from scratch at the Exhibition site.  Since authenticity was regarded as of the utmost importance, trees, shrubs, wooden buildings, bridges, and even stones were brought in from Japan.

One of the many aims of the Exhibition was to introduce the civilization of Japan to the western world, showing past, recent present and projected future. The intent was to show that Japan was not a country that had suddenly leapt from a state of semi-barbarism to one of high civilization in the middle of the nineteenth century, but had always been “progressive”, and that the modernization of Japan since 1868 was only a natural progression.  This was illustrated with twelve impressively full-sized dioramas with wax figures, showing the progression of Japanese history.

Each of the Japanese government ministries was represented, along with the Japanese Red Cross and the post office, showing displays of the modern systems and facilities used by the governmental departments.

Displays about Taiwan, Korea, the Kwantung Leased Territory, and 10 Ainu from Hokkaidō were meant to demonstrate that Japan was following in Great Britain's footsteps as an imperial power to improve the lives of the ‘natives’ in its colonies.

Almost 500 Japanese firms sent items to London. Care was taken only to display the highest possible quality, to offset popular images that Japanese products were cheaply made and tawdry.

Artists represented included ceramicists Yabu Meizan and Miyagawa Kozan as well as the cloisonné artists Namikawa Sōsuke, Kawade Shibatarō and Ando Jubei. The Samurai Shokai Company won a gold medal for a set of metalwork pieces.

One of the most popular craftsmen in the Exhibition was Horikawa Kozan, a celebrated potter. He was invited to demonstrate pottery-making and repair priceless antiquities, some of which had been in the possession of British collectors for generations.

The most remarkable British exhibit was the full sized gyroscopically balanced Brennan mono-rail, which gave rides of around 40 passengers at a time around a 1-mile track, and which was awarded the Grand Prize as the best exhibit. During the exhibition Winston Churchill (then Home Secretary) rode upon the car, and drove it for one circuit, he was so impressed that he arranged for the Prime Minister, H. H. Asquith and David Lloyd George among others to travel on the mono-rail in early November.

Reaction

Japanese
A number of the Japanese visitors felt that the display showing a “typical Japanese village” to be an embarrassment, depicting as it did the life of peasants in northeast Japan.  Although not far from the truth, this was not the impression that Japan wished to convey to the Western public. These comments dominated in Japanese newspapers leading to the prevalent negative opinion that 'the exhibition was a failure'. Korehiro Kurahara, a member of the Japanese House of Representatives, spoke before the National Diet on January 25, 1911 disapproving of the exhibition. The Japanese were most concerned with how best Japan could convince the British public that it was worthy to be considered a modern and civilized ally and equal to any western nation.

Some Japanese correspondents in London also stated that certain exotic and entertaining 'attractions', in the shape of sideshows organized by the entrepreneur who organized the Exhibition were vulgar, and had been calculated to bring discredit to Japan. Moreover, the exhibition of the Ainu and Taiwanese natives together with their native dwellings was regarded as controversial and demeaning.

Consequently, in Japanese history, mention of the Japan–British Exhibition of 1910 is often neglected in favor of other events that year, such as Captain Nobu Shirase's Antarctic expedition.

British
The negative views of the Exhibition in Japanese newspapers were in contrast to those of almost all British newspapers, which gave wide and detailed coverage and contained favorable reviews, especially on some of the exhibits of fine arts and the gardens.

Aftermath

The final stage of the Exhibition was the disposal of the exhibits.  These fell into three categories: those to be sent back to Japan (400 boxes in three separate shipments), those to be presented to various institutions (over 200 boxes divided between thirty recipients), and those to be sent to other cities in Europe where international exhibitions were projected for the near future (Dresden and Turin, both in 1911).

The Chokushimon (Gateway of the Imperial Messenger) (four-fifths replica of the Karamon of Nishi Hongan-ji in Kyoto) was moved to Kew Gardens a year later, where it still can be seen.

See also
 Japan–United Kingdom relations
 Hakuhō period
 History of Shepherd's Bush

Notes

References
 
 Hennessey, John L. "Moving up in the world: Japan’s manipulation of colonial imagery at the 1910 Japan–British Exhibition." Museum History Journal 11.1 (2018): 24-41. 
 Hotta-Lister, Ayako, The Japan-British Exhibition of 1910: gateway to the island empire of the East Richmond, Surrey: Japan Library, 1999. 
 Mochizuki, Kotarō. (1910) Japan To-day. A Souvenir of the Anglo-Japanese Exhibition held in London, 1910. Tokyo: Liberal News Agency. OCLC 5327867
 Mutsu, H., British Press and the Japan-British Exhibition of 1910, Routledge, 2001

External links
 An illustrated catalogue of Japanese old fine arts displayed at the Japan-British Exhibition, London, 1910 via Internet Archive
 An illustrated catalogue of Japanese modern fine arts displayed at the Japan-British exhibition, London, 1910 via Internet Archive
 An Illustrated Catalogue of Japanese Old Fine Arts Displayed at The Japan-British Exhibition London & An Illustrated Catalogue of Japanese Modern Fine Arts Displayed at The Japan-British Exhibition London (summary and selected plates)
 Photographs and illustrations from the Japan-British Exhibition of 1910

World's fairs in London
Japan–United Kingdom relations
Foreign relations of the Empire of Japan
1910 in the United Kingdom
1910 in Japan
E
1910 in international relations
History of the London Borough of Hammersmith and Fulham
White City, London
Festivals established in 1910
1910 in London